Anthony Earle Peter Butler (born 13 February 1957) is a British bassist, best known for his work with Scottish rock band Big Country. He has also worked with On the Air, The Pretenders, Roger Daltrey, and Pete Townshend, among others.

Early life
Butler was born at Hammersmith Hospital in White City, London, England. His parents had emigrated to England from the Caribbean island of Dominica.

Career
In the late 1970s Butler joined the short-lived band On the Air which also included drummer Mark Brzezicki and Simon Townshend (the younger brother of The Who's guitarist Pete Townshend). On the Air released two singles in 1980 and toured with the Scottish band The Skids, which was where Butler met Stuart Adamson. In 1982 Butler joined Adamson's new band Big Country with his drumming partner Mark Brzezicki, which went on to enjoy success internationally during the 1980s and 1990s, he remained in the band until the end of 2000.

He also did session work with other artists including Pete Townshend, Roger Daltrey and The Pretenders among others, and declined an invitation by Chrissie Hynde to join The Pretenders. A warm-up bass riff Butler used was incorporated into The Pretenders' "My City Was Gone" and was also co-opted by The Rush Limbaugh Show as its opening theme.

In 2007, to celebrate 25 years of Big Country, Butler reunited with founder members Bruce Watson and Mark Brzezicki to embark on a tour of the UK. He became lead vocalist for the first time, taking over from the deceased Stuart Adamson. The band toured during 2010–11 with Mike Peters of The Alarm on vocals. Butler left Big Country again in 2012, citing differences with his bandmates, to be replaced by former Simple Minds bassist Derek Forbes.

Butler moved to Cornwall with his family in the 1980s and became a further education teacher in the 2000s. As of 2017, Butler ran courses in music at Petroc College in Devon.

While Butler did not join The Pretenders permanently, he did a couple of sessions with them, out of which came the 1982 singles "My City Was Gone" and "Back on the Chain Gang".

In 2017/18, Butler released an autobiography and a solo album, My Time.

Discography

Solo albums
Tony Butler has released three solo albums:
The Great Unknown (1997)
Life Goes On (2005)
My Time (2018)

References

External links
Official website
Pretenders 977 Radio

Living people
1957 births
Big Country members
Black British rock musicians
English people of Dominica descent
English rock bass guitarists
Male bass guitarists
Musicians from London
People from Shepherd's Bush
The Pretenders members